Poshtkuh Rural District is a rural district (dehestan) in Shahmirzad District, Mehdishahr County, Semnan Province, Iran. At the 2006 census, its population was 1,825, in 561 families.  The rural district has 12 villages.

References 

Rural Districts of Semnan Province
Mehdishahr County